The Mount Gretna Narrow Gauge Railway was a  narrow-gauge line of the Cornwall and Lebanon Railroad in the state of Pennsylvania that operated between 1889 and 1916.  The Cornwall and Lebanon Railroad earlier had established a station and picnic ground at Mount Gretna.

History 
The Gilded Age iron industrialist and railroad president Robert Habersham Coleman decided that a  narrow-gauge railroad to the top of nearby Governor Dick Mountain would provide an additional tourist draw, and a  spur at milepost 0.75 could service the Pennsylvania National Guard rifle ranges nearby. Locomotives, apart from an early and unsuccessful H. K. Porter, Inc  Forney locomotive, were three  "American" types (#11, #12 and #15) built by Baldwin Locomotive Works. Locomotive #12 was ordered on 22 June 1889 and built in only 8 days to be ready for anticipated Independence Day crowds after the Porter Forney wheelbase proved too rigid for reliable service on small-radius curves. The Baldwin locomotives featured lagged smokeboxes and were the only  gauge s ever operated in North America; although Baldwin built a  gauge  for the Ferrocarril de Tacubaya of Mexico City in 1897.

A turntable, engine-house, water tank, runaround track, and storage tracks were near the junction with the Cornwall & Lebanon at Mount Gretna. Return loops were built near the rifle range and around Governor Dick peak. During the summer of 1889 passengers were carried in one conventional coach and 7 open-sided observation cars boarded from long foot-boards running along the length of either side of the car. These eight passenger cars were built by the Jackson & Sharp Company. Two more observation cars were added when locomotive #15 was purchased for the summer of 1890. At first the railroad was popular, but the tourist trade declined after the novelty had died down. The loop around Governor Dick was dismantled after the summer of 1896, but the railroad continued operation for the National Guard rifle range. A serious accident in 1915 killed off that traffic. One of the observation cars overturned on a sharp curve when a large number of guardsmen attempted to board simultaneously from one side of the car. There were some serious injuries, and the tiny railroad ceased operation in the summer of 1916, shortly after its parent company's purchase by the Pennsylvania Railroad. The narrow-gauge equipment was loaded aboard standard gauge cars on 14 September 1916.

Locomotives

Cornwall and Lebanon Railroad 
The standard-gauge Cornwall and Lebanon Railroad continued operations as a branch of the Pennsylvania Railroad, and later Penn Central Transportation Company until 1972. Hurricane Agnes caused flood damage, preventing operation of trains on the branch, and the damage was not repaired. The branch was converted to the 21st-century Lebanon Valley Rail Trail after the rails were removed.

References

Notes

2 ft gauge railways in the United States
Narrow gauge railroads in Pennsylvania
Railway lines closed in 1916
Defunct Pennsylvania railroads